Jonathan Joseph Heder (born October 26, 1977) is an American actor, best known for his role as the title character of the 2004 comedy film Napoleon Dynamite. He has also appeared in the films Just Like Heaven, The Benchwarmers, School for Scoundrels, Blades of Glory, Mama's Boy, When in Rome, and as Roy Disney in Walt Before Mickey. He also provided voice work for the animated films Monster House, Surf's Up, and Pinocchio, as well as the Napoleon Dynamite animated series.

Early life

Heder was born in Fort Collins, Colorado, the son of Helen (née Brammer) and physician James Heder. He has an identical twin brother, Dan; an older sister, Rachel; an older brother, Doug; and two younger brothers, Adam and Matt. He is of Swedish descent, and is a nephew by marriage of former NFL player Vai Sikahema. When he was about two years old, he and his parents moved to Salem, Oregon. He attended Walker Middle School in Salem and graduated from South Salem High School in 1996, where he was a member of the swim team and drama club. He is also an Eagle Scout, and served as a Scoutmaster in 2010.

A 2002 alumnus of Brigham Young University, Heder worked on the short animated film Pet Shop. When his acting career gained traction, he did not return to complete the work he had started on the short, though his name still appears in the credits. While attending BYU, he befriended Jared Hess and starred in Hess' short film Peluca, which was later expanded into Napoleon Dynamite.

Career
The comedy feature Napoleon Dynamite, filmed in Preston, Idaho, earned $44.5 million. In June 2005, Heder received the MTV Movie Award for Best Musical Performance and Breakthrough Male Performance for the role. On October 8, 2005, he hosted Saturday Night Live with musical guest Ashlee Simpson. Heder and his film co-star Efren Ramirez then filmed a series of commercials to promote the 2015 Utah State Fair, and reprised their roles in a self-parody sketch, "Napoleon Bonamite", on the animated series Robot Chicken. 

In 2005, Heder had a supporting role as a clerk in a new age bookstore in the romantic comedy Just Like Heaven. In 2006, he appeared in the comedy film The Sasquatch Gang; and had a starring role with Rob Schneider and David Spade in producer Adam Sandler's The Benchwarmers (2006), a comedy about three men making up for lost chances by creating their own Little League baseball team. Also in 2006, Heder was the voice of the character Skull in the animated film Monster House, and starred in the comedy School for Scoundrels, opposite Billy Bob Thornton and Jacinda Barrett. He co-starred in 2007 with Will Ferrell in the well-received Blades of Glory (2007) where, as in many of his films, he plays an absurd, slapstick caricature—this time, one of two rival figure skaters who must team up in a pairs competition.

Heder's second turn at voice acting came in 2007 when he voiced Chicken Joe, a surfing chicken, in the animated film Surf's Up. His first foray into web television was the 2008 web series Woke Up Dead, which he produced and starred in. The live-action, sci-fi comedy thriller follows Drex, a USC student who wakes up underwater in the bathtub one morning and suspects he may be dead.

Heder and his twin brother, Dan, star together as villains in the fourth installment of the popular internet martial arts comedy series Sockbaby. Heder's performance in When in Rome was praised by New York Times critic A. O. Scott: "Jon Heder as a goofy street magician is the funniest of the bunch." In 2012, Heder returned to the role that made him famous by supplying the voice of Napoleon Dynamite in the Fox Network animated series, Napoleon Dynamite, which debuted in January 2012. In 2013, Heder appeared in the music video for "On Top of the World" with numerous other Utah-based actors and musicians, and in 2014 he appeared in the music video for the Chromeo song "Old 45s".

In January 2017, Heder reprised his role as Chicken Joe in Surf's Up 2: WaveMania, the direct-to video sequel to Surf's Up.

Personal life
Heder has been married to Kirsten Bales since 2002, having met her while attending Brigham Young University. They are members of the Church of Jesus Christ of Latter-day Saints and have four children.

Filmography

Film

Television

Web

Video

Music videos

References

External links

 
 
 One of Jon Heders first projects
 Snopes article debunking the myth of his death
 Video and transcript of an interview with Heder
 Jon Heder on The Hour

1977 births
Male actors from Colorado
Male actors from Salem, Oregon
American male film actors
Latter Day Saints from Colorado
Latter Day Saints from Oregon
Brigham Young University alumni
Identical twin male actors
Living people
Actors from Fort Collins, Colorado
American twins
South Salem High School alumni
21st-century American male actors
American male voice actors
American people of Swedish descent
People from Saugus, Santa Clarita, California
American male television actors
American Mormon missionaries in Japan